Narapani is a market center in Sandhikharka Municipality of Arghakhanchi District in the Lumbini Zone of southern Nepal. The former village development committee (VDC) was converted into municipality on 18 May 2014 by merging the existing Sandhikharka, Bangla, Narapani, Khanchikot, Keemadada, Argha and Dibharna VDCs. At the time of the 1991 Nepal census it had a population of 4,664 and had 873 houses in the town.

References

Populated places in Arghakhanchi District